Once There Was a Girl, is a 1944 Soviet drama film directed by Viktor Eisymont.

Plot 
The film tells about two girls during the siege of Leningrad who survived the famine, cold, death of their mother and a serious wound.

Starring 
 Nina Ivanova as Nastenka
 Natalya Zashchipina as Katya (as Natasha Zashchipina)
 Ada Vojtsik as Nastenka's Mother
 Vera Altayskaya as Katya's mother (as V. Altayskaya)
 Lidiya Shtykan as Tonya (as L. Shtykan)
 Aleksandr Larikov as Makar Ivanovich (as A. Larikov)
 Nikolai Korn as Nastenka's father (as N. Korn)
 Elena Kirillova as Stepanida (as E. Kirillova)

References

External links 
 

1944 films
1940s Russian-language films
Soviet drama films
Soviet black-and-white films
1944 drama films